York Gate or Yorkgate may refer to:

 York Gate, Leeds, house and garden
 York Gate, London, an entrance to Regent's Park
 York Gate Library, Adelaide, Australia
 York Gate Collections, London, now the Royal Academy of Music Museum
 Yorkgate railway station, Belfast, Northern Ireland